Ravi Shanker Jha (born 14 October 1961) is an Indian judge, currently serving as the chief justice of Punjab and Haryana High Court. He is former acting chief justice of Madhya Pradesh High Court.

Career 
Jha obtained a law degree in 1986 from Rani Durgavati Vishwavidyalaya, Jabalpur, and was enrolled as an advocate on 20 September 1986 with the State Bar Council of Madhya Pradesh, joining the chamber of Shri P. P. Naolekar that year. Jha practiced in Madhya Pradesh High Court since the day of enrollment. He was elevated as additional judge of Madhya Pradesh High Court on 18 October 2005 and became a permanent judge on 2 February 2007. Jha was appointed acting chief justice of Madhya Pradesh High Court on 10 June 2019 after retirement of Chief Justice Sanjay Kumar Seth, and was appointed chief justice of Punjab and Haryana High Court on 6 October 2019.

References

Living people
Indian judges
Judges of the Madhya Pradesh High Court
1961 births